Mecistocephalidae are a monophyletic family of centipedes in the order Geophilomorpha. It is the only family in the suborder Placodesmata. Most species in this family live in tropical or subtropical regions, but some occur in temperate regions. This family is the third most diverse in the order Geophiliomorpha (after Geophilidae and Schendylidae), with about 170 species, including about 130 species in the genus Mecistocephalus.

This family differs from all other geophilomorphs insofar as the number of segments in mecistocephalids is generally fixed within each species and the same for each sex. The family includes centipedes with odd numbers of leg-bearing segments ranging from as few as 41 to as many as 101. A majority of the species in the genus Mecistocephalus have 49 pairs of legs, a majority so large that most species in the family Mecistocephalidae have 49 leg pairs, even though only one mecistocephalid species (Proterotaiwanella sculptulata) outside the genus Mecistocephalus shares this number. The next most common numbers are 45 leg pairs, found in most species in the genus Tygarrup as well as in species distributed among five other genera, and 41 leg pairs, found in all species in the genera Agnostrup, Anarrup, Arrup, Nannarrup, and Partygarrupius as well as in two species of Dicellophilus; fewer mecistocephalid species have 47 leg pairs (e.g., Mecistocephalus angusticeps and M. tahitiensis) or 51 leg pairs (e.g., M. sechellarum and M. lifuensis), found only in the genus Mecistocephalus, and the other remaining numbers are even more rare (e.g., 43 leg pairs, found in Dicellophilus carniolensis).

Intraspecific variation in the number of leg-bearing segments within each sex has been recorded among the mecistocephalid species with the greatest number of legs: Mecistocephalus diversisternus, which has 57 or 59 leg pairs, M. japonicus, which has 63 or 65 leg pairs, and M. microporus, which has odd numbers of leg pairs ranging from 93 to 101. Other mecistocephalid species with many legs are known from samples too small to provide persuasive evidence of intraspecific invariance (e.g., M. cyclops, with 57 leg pairs in the only known specimen). The mecistocephalid species Krateraspis sselivanovi has 53 leg pairs without intraspecific variation, which appears to be the maximum number evidently fixed by species in the class Chilopoda.

Genera 
The family contains the following genera:
Agnostrup  
Anarrup 
Arrup  
Dicellophilus
Krateraspis
Mecistocephalus
Nannarrup 
Partygarrupius
Proterotaiwanella
Takashimaia
Tygarrup

Description
Species of the suborder Placodesmata are characterized by an elongated head with lateral margins converging backwards; first maxillae with relatively elongate coxosternite, and coxal projections much wider than telopodites, both ending with a distinctly hyaline part; second maxillae with small simple claws; elongate forcipular coxosternite with pleurites projecting anteriorly into scapular points and displaced dorsally so that the coxopleural sutures run anteriorly on the dorsal side; metatergites of the posterior part of the trunk distinctly longer than those on the anterior part.

References

Centipede families
Geophilomorpha